Dabiri is the surname of the following people:
Abike Dabiri, Nigerian politician
Bahram Dabiri (born 1950), Iranian painter and artist
John Dabiri (born 1980), American biophysicist, professor of aeronautics and bioengineering 
Shahram Dabiri Oskuei (born 1960), Iranian politician, physician and sporting director